Yedingham Priory was a Benedictine priory in North Yorkshire, England dedicated to the Blessed Virgin Mary.  It was home to Benedictine nuns from 1163 to 1539.

The priory, also known as Little Mareis, was co founded by Helewise de Clere and Roger II de Clere.

References

Monasteries in North Yorkshire
Benedictine nunneries in England
1163 establishments in England
Christian monasteries established in the 12th century
1539 disestablishments in England